The name Santi has been used for two tropical cyclones in the Philippines by PAGASA in the Western Pacific Ocean. It was originally named as Sibak in 2001.

 Typhoon Mirinae (2009) (T0921, 23W, Santi) – made landfall on Luzon, Philippines, and later Southern Vietnam.
 Typhoon Nari (2013) (T1325, 24W, Santi) – a strong and deadly tropical cyclone that struck the Philippines and Vietnam.

Santi was retired from use in the Philippine area of responsibility after the 2013 typhoon season and replaced with Salome in the 2017 season.

Pacific typhoon set index articles